Castrignano may refer to:

Castrignano del Capo, a town in the province of Lecce, Italy
Castrignano de' Greci, a town in the province of Lecce, Italy, part of the Grecìa Salentina